Highway 5 is a major highway in the Canadian province of Saskatchewan. It begins in downtown Saskatoon and runs eastward to the Manitoba border near Togo, where it becomes Provincial Road 363. At this time it started at the Alberta border in Lloydminster and traveled east to the Manitoba border.

In the summer of 1970, the section of highway between Lloydminster and Saskatoon was designated to be a portion of the Yellowhead Highway. This section of highway  maintained the Highway 5 designation until 1976, when it was redesignated as Highway 16 to maintain the same number through the four western provinces (Manitoba followed suit the following year, redesignating its section of the Yellowhead Highway from PTH 4 to PTH 16).

Along the route are several heritage sites, an international bird watching area, saline lakes, as well as regional and provincial parks. Museums and historical markers commemorate the region's history along the highway.

Route description
Highway 5 begins near downtown Saskatoon at Idylwyld Drive North (Highway 11 and 12), as 25th Street East. Saskatoon is the most populous city located in central Saskatchewan, Canada, on the South Saskatchewan River, with a metropolitan population of 233,923.  The highway starting terminus is adjacent to the Saskatoon Railway Station a national historic site classified as a Designated Heritage Railway Station.  Along 25th Street, there is a historic marker commemorating the King Edward School building the first home of Saskatoon's city hall, and the Saskatoon World War memorial marker. The Meewasin Valley Trail follows the South Saskatchewan River through Saskatoon which is visible when Highway 5 traverses the University Bridge.  At the top of the bridge is the University of Saskatchewan's President's Residence which was constructed between 1910 and 1913.  East of the residence are the Memorial Gates are a World War I memorial, the interment site of the Honourable Sir Frederick W. A. G. Haultain's ashes, the entrance to the Royal University Hospital and University of Saskatchewan.  It becomes College Drive after crossing the river, and at km 4.4, after passing Preston Avenue, the road diverges into a divided or twinned highway with 2 lanes traveling in either direction across a meridian  Continuing east it intersects the Circle Drive freeway route (Highway 16) at an interchange that opened in 2006. After a signalized intersection with Central Avenue and an interchange with McKercher Drive, and then meets one of the city's newest interchanges at McOrmond Drive. Highway 5 leaves Saskatoon's city limits where it undivides, at approx. km 14.  
Leaving Saskatoon, travel is through a moist mixed grassland ecoregion. Small Aspen groves surround sloughs which intersperse the glacial till landscape. The highway is paved between Saskatoon and Kamsack. Just outside the city limits, Highway 5 connects with Highway 41 at the site of a small commercial area that, as of 2007, included the Sundown Drive-In, one of Canada's last operational drive-in movie theatres. The remainder of the highway to the Manitoba border is an undivided highway. The communities of Strawberry Hills, Discovery Ridge and Settler's Ridge are just off km 18 on Highway 5. At km 21, Highway 5 intersects Highway 316.

Patience Lake is located at km 24.3 and the Patience Lake potash mine is visible from Highway 5. "Patience Lake is a shallow, permanent, hypersaline lake east of Saskatoon in an area of extensive potash extraction. "  The Patience Lake underground potash mine opened in 1975 was thereafter closed in 1987 due to extensive flooding.  A new solution mine was reopened in 1988.

At km 41, it intersects Highway 671, near the town of St. Denis. At km 64, it intersects Highway 2, where it begins a  concurrency. Highway 5 continues east at km 70.

The town of Peterson is at km 76 and Highway 670 is at km 87. The ecoregion changes to aspen parkland.  Grasslands are resident on the upper slopes, and aspen groves on the lower areas.  There tend to be more aspen groves in the aspen parkland as compared to the mixed grassland area. At km 109, the highway passes through the town of Dixon.

The city of Humboldt is at km 115. Highway 5 also connects with Highway 20 in Humboldt. A new Humboldt tourist booth was opened in 1971 on the highway edge.  Humboldt has many large murals depicting its German Catholic history located on building walls throughout the city.  The Humboldt and District Museum and Gallery is located in a 1912 post office and customs office with its landmark tower clock which has been declared a national historic site.  

The Carlton Trail Regional Economic Development Authority (REDA) coordinates and instigates economy in an area of rural municipalities (RM) and towns in central Saskatchewan around Humboldt.  The main industries of this area are agricultural, manufacturing, processing concerns as well as potash mining.  A more recent industry to the area is tourism.

North of the city is the Humboldt 18 hole grass green golf course on Highway 5. Original works by the painter, Count Berthold Von Imhoff, can be seen at churches located in Muenster and Humboldt. The establishment of St. Peter’s Colony and Abbacy, Muenster, Saskatchewan has been designated as a Canadian National Historic Event  on June 8, 2007, by the Minister of the Environment. After Humboldt, Highway 5 passes through the town of Muenster at km 123 and intersects with Highway 368 at km 125.

Highway 667 is at km 135, and the town of St. Gregor is at km 136. It then passes through the town of Englefeld (km 147).  The village of Englefeld has a  hog which was built to celebrate the 25th Annual Hogfest celebration.  The historic Wood Mountain - Fort Qu'Appelle Trail is marked with a point of interest marker.  McNab Regional Park is located south of Watson featuring pool and golf course.  Watson is located at the concurrency of Highway 5 and Highway 6, the CanAm Highway. At the intersection with Highway 6 is Watson (km 156).  Watson (Vossen, NWT) is known as the Industrial Crossroads of Saskatchewan being the midpoint between Regina, Saskatchewan, and Saskatoon.  Watson celebrated its first Santa Claus Day in 1922, and has erected a -high Santa Claus to commemorate this event.

Highway 5 then passes through Wimmer (km 165), and Quill Lake (km 175). The village of Quill Lake features a large statue of a Canada Goose located at the intersection of Highway 5 and Main Street. The Highway 5 - Highway 35 junction features a historical plaque which commemorates the Touchwood Hills Hudson's Bay Company fur trade post established in 1879.  The Carlton Trail and telegraph line are also remembered at this site where only a portion of the trail and the post cellar depression remain.

The highway continues east meeting with Highway 640 (km 176), Clair (km 191), and Paswegin (km 199).  It enters the town of Wadena and intersects with Highway 35 at km 210.  Wadena Wildlife Wetlands and Wadena Museum and Nature Centre are features of Wadena, the Northern Gateway to the Quill Lakes International Bird Area.  Wadena Wildlife Wetlands and Wadena Museum and Nature Centre are features of Wadena, the Northern Gateway to the Quill Lakes International Bird Area.  These communities along with Quill Lake, “Goose Capital of Saskatchewan”, are all part of the  Quill Lakes communities of Quill Lake.

Highway 5's next minor intersections are at Kylemore and Highway 665 (km 222), Kuroki and Highway 38 (km 232), Highway 310 (km 234), Margo (km 244), Highway 617 and Invermay (km 256).  Good Spirit REDA extends from Carlton Trail REDA to the Manitoba border, with its focus being tourism.  The REDA is an agriculture based area around Good Spirit Provincial Park.  Highway 755 connects with Rama (km 268) and Theodore.

Rama was incorporated as a village in 1919 by John Berge.  It is located on the edge of Spirit Creek, a tributary of Good Spirit Lake.  Rama is home to St. Michaels church, a provincial historical site.  Also at home in Rama is the Grotto of Our Lady of Lourdes and St. Anthony's Church.  A religious pilgrimage is held at the grotto each year on August 14 and 15, persons of all faith are always welcome and all are free to have a self-guided tour of the grotto and attend the annual pilgrimage.

Olysky (Big Sky Farms) runs large factory hog production facilities in the area.

The highway then leaves Rama and continues on through Dernic (km 278), Highway 47 and Buchanan (km 286).  Good Spirit Lake Provincial Park is located south of Buchanan and south-west of Canora. Camping facilities provide access to beaches, lake and a small area of sand dunes.  Highway 5 continues through the appropriately named hamlet of Tiny and intersects with Highway 664 (km 299).  To the north of Highway 664 is the Sturgis ski hill, as well as small heritage museums in both Sturgis and Preeceville.  The junction with Highway 651 is at km 309. The town of Canora, “Heart of Good Spirit Country”, is at km 311, where Highway 5 has a 2 km concurrency with Highway 9, the Saskota flyway.  "Lesia", a  statue of a traditionally dressed Ukrainian woman offering bread and salt to travelers at Canora.  Also within Canora are the Canora Station House Museum, Ukrainian Heritage Museum and Canada's Only Toy and Autograph Museum.  Ukrainian Orthodox Heritage Church of the Holy Trinity in Canora was designated a heritage site in 1984 by the town of Canora and it underwent restoration. In the Good Spirit REDA, Canora features a flax straw processing plant,  manufacturing plant, and meat processing plant. 

The next few intersections on Highway 5 are at Highway 650 and Ross Junction (km 319), Mikado (km 326), and Veregin and Highway 637 (km 339). The town of Kamsack, at km 352, is the last major town that Highway 5 passes through. Within Kamsack is the Kamsack Power House Museum which features local artifacts and historic memorabilia.  The Doukhobour Heritage Village is a historical attraction at Verigin.  Highway 5 also intersects Highway 8 near Kamsack.  

To the north of Highway 5, and east of Kamsack is the Duck Mountain Provincial Park. This height of land location features Madge Lake, camping, fishing, and horse stables. The highest elevation is near the Manitoba border near Duck Mountain. Highway 5 then intersects Highway 57 at km 360. From Highway 57, the highway turns south and meanders to the southeast as it passes the access to the town of Coté (km 365) and through the towns of Runnymede (km 374) and Togo (km 387), where it also intersects Highway 357 and Highway 369.

The highway is paved for its entire length. The section from Highway 57 through Togo and onwards to the Manitoba border is a very narrow and lightly used two lane highway with little to no shoulder on either side.

History

The early Red River cart trail traversed the North West Territory prairies between Portage la Prairie and Edmonton via Humboldt and Battleford, intersecting the future location of Highway 5 at Humboldt.  The Dominion Government Telegraph Line was constructed in 1875, which was parallel to the future Highway 5.   Both Red River Cart trail and telegraph line were abandoned in the 1920s.

In 1925, Provincial Highway 5, the Evergreen Route, followed the surveyed rail line route of the Canadian Northern Railway, later the Canadian National Railway.  Provincial Highway 5 had a western terminus at Lloydminster located on the Alberta - Saskatchewan border.  When the province was surveyed, the road evolved from a dirt road to a gravel road.  This was finally improved to an all-weather road known as Provincial Highway 5 from the Alberta–Saskatchewan border bypassing Saskatoon to the north, and continuing on to the Manitoba–Saskatchewan border.  Just as the rail line went through Aberdeen, Warman, and Langham, so too did Provincial Highway 5.  In 1925, access from Saskatoon to Provincial Highway 5 was via Provincial Highway 12 which was a route due north of the city.  The other connection was Provincial Highway 27 which traveled east and north from Saskatoon connecting to Provincial Highway 5 at the junction located at the town of Aberdeen. In the late 1950s and 1960s, the highway was straightened and widened.  During this process, the current Saskatchewan Highway 5 connected Humboldt and Saskatoon in a more direct west and east highway.  The old place names of Warman, Aberdeen, Vonda, Prudhomme, Dana, Bruno, and Carmel located on Provincial Highway 5 were no longer place names along Saskatchewan Highway 5.  Now the Highway 2 concurrency was the only north-south stretch between Humboldt and Saskatoon and Meacham the only place name.  On  August 15, 1970 the Yellowhead was opened for the northern Trans-Canada route and the northwestern half of Provincial Highway 5 between Saskatoon and Lloydminster was designated as Saskatchewan Highway 16, the Yellowhead route.

Travel along the Provincial Highway 5 before the 1940s would have been traveling on the square following the township road allowances, barbed wire fencing and rail lines.  As the surveyed township roads were the easiest to travel, the  first highway was designed on 90-degree, right-angle corners as the distance traversed the prairie along range roads and township roads. 1926 Saskatchewan map

Highway 5 was constructed through Englefeld in 1961. John Koenig was one of the first residents of Englefeld to own a car, a Ford touring car purchased in the 1920s.

Upgrades
Canadian Pacific Railway crossing lights were installed on Highway 5 at the east end of Humboldt.  At the junction of Highway 20 and Highway 5, there were traffic lights installed in 1973.  West Humboldt properties announced in the fall of 2008 that The Quill Centre will be opened in the fall of 2009 along Highway 5.

Jan 3, 1910, was the first meeting of the RM of Blucher 343.  In 1911, early homesteaders could choose to pay taxes at $9.00 per quarter section of land or working off $4.00 of this expense by constructing roads.  A labourer and two horse team could earn 50 cents an hour and a four-horse team with a driver was allotted 70 cents an hour.

A resurfacing improvement project was undertaken for an  stretch between Mikado and Canora.  The $1 million project was completed in the summer of 2001.  In the summer of 2000,  received resurfacing improvements between Verigin and Mikado. In February 2003, the Department of Highways awarded a tender to resurface  from Quill Lake and eastward.  "We are maintaining our focus on building better highways.  Work on this $940,000 resurfacing project ... should be complete within two weeks", said Highways and Transportation Minister Mark Wartman.

Major intersections
From west to east:

Notes

References

External links 

005
005
Humboldt, Saskatchewan
Streets in Saskatoon